Nicolás Amerise (born July 10, 1990) is an Argentine former footballer.

External links
 
 

1990 births
Living people
Argentine footballers
Argentine expatriate footballers
Unión de Santa Fe footballers
FBC Melgar footballers
Argentine Primera División players
Peruvian Primera División players
Expatriate footballers in Peru
Association football forwards
Footballers from Santa Fe, Argentina